American gospel girl group Trin-i-tee 5:7 has released five studio albums, two compilation albums, one holiday album, one extended play, and fifteen singles.

Trin-i-tee 5:7 released their self-titled debut album in the United States in July 1998 and it peaked at number 139 on the Billboard 200. It earned a gold certification in the United States by the Recording Industry Association of America (RIAA). The album's lead single, "God's Grace", reached number twenty-three on the Billboard Gospel Airplay. Second album, Spiritual Love, was released in December 1999, and was their breakthrough release debuting at number 1 on the Billboard Top Gospel Albums chart. The second single, "My Body", peaked at number thirty-five on the US Billboard Adult R&B Songs. The album eventually sold over one million copies worldwide.

The group's third album, The Kiss, was released in the summer of 2002 and peaked at number two on Billboard Top Gospel Albums. After a five year hiatus, the group reunited to record their fourth studio album, T57, released in September 2007. The album reached number two on the Top Gospel Albums. Three singles were released from the album: "Listen", "I Will Lift", and "Get Away". A fifth studio album, Angel & Chanelle, was released in May 2011 following their split. Trin-i-tee 5:7 has sold over 2.5 million records worldwide, and All Music Guide ranks them as one of the most successful contemporary gospel acts of their era.

Albums

Studio albums

Christmas album

Compilation albums

Extended play

Singles

Album appearances

Music videos

References

Discographies of American artists
Christian music discographies
Pop music group discographies
Rhythm and blues discographies